Aurora is a Russian protected cruiser, currently preserved as a museum ship in Saint Petersburg. Aurora was one of three  cruisers, built in Saint Petersburg for service in the Pacific. All three ships of this class served during the Russo-Japanese War. Aurora survived the Battle of Tsushima and was interned under US protection in the Philippines, and eventually returned to the Baltic Fleet.

One of the first incidents of the October Revolution in Russia took place on the cruiser Aurora, which reportedly fired the first shot, signalling the beginning of the attack on the Winter Palace.

Russo-Japanese War

Soon after completion, on October 10, 1903,  Aurora departed Kronstadt as part of Admiral Virenius's "reinforcing squadron"  for Port Arthur. 
While in the Red Sea, still enroute to Port Arthur, the squadron was recalled back to the Baltic Sea, under protest by Admiral Makarov, who specifically requested Admiral Virenius to continue his mission to Port Arthur.  Only the seven destroyers of the reinforcing squadron were allowed to continue to the Far East.

After her detachment from the reinforcing squadron and her arrival back to home port she underwent new refitting. After refitting, Aurora was ordered back to Port Arthur as part of the Russian Baltic Fleet  Aurora sailed as part of Admiral Oskar Enkvist's Cruiser Squadron whose flagship would be the protected cruiser Oleg, an element of Admiral Zinovy Rozhestvensky's Baltic Fleet. 
On the way to the Far East, Aurora received five hits, sustaining light damage from confused friendly fire, which killed the ship's chaplain and a sailor, in the Dogger Bank incident.

On 27 and 28 May 1905 Aurora took part in the Battle of Tsushima, along with the rest of the Russian squadron. During the battle her captain, Captain 1st rank Evgeny Egoriev, and 14 crewmen were killed.

October Revolution mutiny

During World War I Aurora operated in the Baltic Sea performing patrols and shore bombardment tasks. In 1915, her armament was changed to fourteen 152 mm (6 in) guns. At the end of 1916, she was moved to Petrograd (the renamed Saint Petersburg) for a major repair. The city was brimming with revolutionary ferment and part of her crew joined the 1917 February Revolution.

The ship's commanding officer, Captain Mikhail Nikolsky, was killed when he tried to suppress the revolt. A revolutionary committee was created on the ship, with Aleksandr Belyshev elected as captain.

Second World War

In 1922 Aurora returned to service as a training ship. Assigned to the Baltic Fleet, from 1923, she repeatedly visited the Baltic Sea countries, including Norway in 1924, 1925, 1928 and 1930, Germany in 1929 and Sweden in 1925 and 1928. On 2 November 1927, Aurora was awarded the Order of the Red Banner for her revolutionary merits.

During the Second World War, the guns were taken from the ship and used in the land defence of Leningrad. The ship herself was docked in Oranienbaum port, and was repeatedly shelled and bombed. On 30 September 1941 she was damaged and sunk in the harbour.

She was later salvaged and repaired after the war.

To the present

Having long served as a museum ship, from 1984 to 1987 the cruiser was once again placed in her construction yard, the Admiralty Shipyard, for capital restoration. During the overhaul, due to deterioration, the ship's hull below the waterline was replaced with a new welded hull according to the original drawings. The cut off lower hull section was towed into the Gulf of Finland, to the unfinished base at Ruchi, and sunk near the shore. The restoration revealed that some of the ship parts, including the armour plates, were originally made in Britain.

In January 2013 Russian Defence Minister Sergey Shoygu announced plans to recommission Aurora and make her the flagship of the Russian Navy due to her historical and cultural importance. On 21 September 2014 the ship was towed to the Admiralty Shipyard in Kronstadt to be overhauled, to return in 2016. On 16 July 2016 she returned to her home harbour in Saint Petersburg.

See also

 , the only other surviving warship from the Battle of Tsushima.
 , a U.S. Navy protected cruiser preserved in Philadelphia
The Twelfth Symphony by Dmitri Shostakovich (title of 3rd movement).
The Baku Metro's  Qara Qarayev Station, formerly named Avrora Station.

References

Sources
British Naval Attache Reports. (2003) The Russo-Japanese War 1904-1905.  The Battery Press. Nashville, Tennessee 
 

Corbett, Sir Julian. (2015) Maritime Operations In The Russo-Japanese War 1904-1905. Vol. 1 originally published January 1914. Naval Institute Press 
Corbett, Sir Julian. (2015) Maritime Operations In The Russo-Japanese War 1904-1905. Vol. 2 originally published October 1915. Naval Institute Press 
Dowling, Timothy C. Russia at War: From the Mongol Conquest to Afghanistan, Chechnya, and Beyond. ABC-CLIO, 2015.

External links

The History of the Russian Navy - Defeat at Port Arthur
HNSA Web Page: Cruiser Aurora
Aurora Cruiser Museum Ship (Saint Petersburg)

1900 ships
Museum ships in Russia
World War I cruisers of Russia
World War II cruisers of the Soviet Union
Cruisers of the Imperial Russian Navy
Ships of the Soviet Navy
History of Saint Petersburg
Naval mutinies
Naval ships of Russia
Maritime museums in Saint Petersburg
Military and war museums in Saint Petersburg
Russian Revolution
Maritime incidents in September 1941
Cultural heritage monuments of federal significance in Saint Petersburg